Lillie Patterson (May 3, 1917 – March 11, 1999) was an American writer who worked as a school and college librarian in Baltimore, Maryland. She wrote 17 books for children and young adults including Martin Luther King, Jr.: Man of Peace about Rev. Martin Luther King Jr. It won the very first Coretta Scott King Award. She also wrote books about the Statue of Liberty, Coretta Scott King, Frederick Douglass, and Booker T. Washington.

She grew up listening to her grandmother telling stories in Hilton Head, South Carolina.

Patterson was African-American. She received a bachelor's degree in elementary education from Hampton University in Hampton, Virginia in the 1940s and a graduate degree in library services from the Catholic University of America in Washington D.C. in the 1950s. She also studied at the Johns Hopkins University and New York University. In 1963 she received the Living Maker of Negro History Award from the Iota Phi Lambda sorority. She also won a Professional Award from the National Association of Negro Business and Professional Women's Clubs in Baltimore and the Helen Keating Award in 1985 from the Church and Synagogue Library Association.

Works
Meet Miss Liberty (1962)
David: The Story of a King (1985)

References

1917 births
1999 deaths
Writers from Baltimore
20th-century women writers
Hampton University alumni
African-American writers
American children's writers
American librarians
Catholic University of America alumni
Johns Hopkins University alumni
New York University alumni